Willow Vale is a rural locality in the City of Gold Coast, Queensland, Australia.

Before the naming of this locality, the area was generally referred to as Pimpama.

History 

Heritage listings

Heritage listings at Willow Vale include:
 105 Ruffles Road: Laurel Hill Farmhouse

Education 
There are no schools in Willow Vale. The nearest government primary schools are Pimpama State School in neighbouring Pimpama to the north, Coomera Spring State School in neighbouring Upper Coomera to the east, and Upper Coomera State College in neighbouring Upper Coomera to the south-east. The nearest government secondary schools are Pimpama State Secondary College in Pimpama to the north-east and Upper Coomera State College  in neighbouring Upper Coomera to the south-east.

Amenities 
There are a number of parks in the area:

 Blacks Road Parklands 1
 Blacks Road Parklands 2

 Coulter Road Reserve

 Crystal Creek Reserve

 Galt Road Park

 Gerrale Dr Reserve 1

 Gerrale Dr Reserve 2

 Gerrale Dr Reserve 3

 Heritage Park

 Hotham Ruffles Reserve

 Lower Galt Road Reserve

 Peanba Park

 Pittas Place Reserve

 Richardson Family Park

 Ruffles Rd Reserve

 Rufous Whistler Park

 The Dell Park

 The Grange Common

 The Grange Environmental Park

 Willowvale Reserve

 Wongawallan Reserve

References

Sources

External links
  — includes Willow Vale

Suburbs of the Gold Coast, Queensland
Localities in Queensland